Signs and Epigrams is a solo album by pianist Sylvie Courvoisier which was released on the Tzadik label in 2007.

Reception

In his review for Allmusic, Blair Sanderson notes that "What makes Signs and Epigrams compelling for intrepid listeners is the density of Courvoisier's constructions, the audacious ways she exploits her materials, and the utter ferocity of her performances. While she demonstrates a fine ear for isolated pitches or the quiet, delicate interplay of lines, and can play conventionally with great subtlety, she makes the greatest impression in her brutal attacks of the keyboard, strings, and even the piano's case: the rawest sound sources are fair game in her highly varied pieces, and she plays with a concentrated force that makes this album bracing to hear and unforgettable for its violence".

Track listing
All compositions by Sylvie Courvoisier
 "Ricochet" - 2:25  
 "Des Signes et des Songes" - 5:11  
 "Meccania" - 7:57  
 "Epigram 1" - 6:33  
 "Epigram 2" - 3:35  
 "Epigram 3" - 4:20  
 "Confins de Lueurs" - 7:36  
 "Chick" - 2:56  
 "Mis en Pièces" - 2:09  
 "Soliloquy" - 10:44

Personnel
Sylvie Courvoisier - piano

References

Tzadik Records albums
Sylvie Courvoisier albums
2007 albums